Vanathai Pola is a 2020 Indian-Tamil-language family drama television series, starring Shreekumar and Maanya Anand. It premiered on 7 December 2020 in Sun TV and digitally streams on Sun NXT. This story focuses on the bond between Chinrasu and his sister Tulasi.

Plot
Vanathai Pola is about the close bond between Chinrasu and his sister Thulasi. Their parents died when they were young. Both were raised by their grandmother. Chinrasu is on the lookout for a perfect groom for Thulasi. However, she repeatedly rejects potential grooms as she doesn't want to leave her brother. As fate would have it, she falls in love with Chinrasu's nemesis, Panchayat board officer.

The crux of the story is what happens between Chinrasu and Thulasi, whether Thulasi marries the groom chosen by Chinrasu, and how this affects their bond. Chinrasu would accept the person who works as a Panchayat board officer, if his sister Thulasi wishes. One of Chinrasu's relatives, Rajapandi, is also interested in marrying Thulasi, but he is not regarded as an ideal match because he smokes and drinks. When Rajapandi and the village Panchayat board officer meet face to face, the quarrel begins.

Cast

Main
Thaman Kumar as Chinrasu replacement ShreeKumar Ganesh as Chinrasu / rasu: Tulasi 's elder brother, Sandhya's love interest, Ponni 's husband. 
Swetha Khelge replacement Maanya Anand as Tulasi Rajapandi: Chinrasu's sister, Rajapandi's wife.

Recurring 
 Debjani Modak as Sandhiya: Chinrasu 's Wife 
 Sangeetha replacement Preethi Kumar replacement Chandini Prakash as Ponni Chinrasu: Nallathoor President Chinrasu 's Wife 
 Ashwanth Thilak as Vetrivel Vetri : Valli 's Husband Tulasi 's ex-lover 
 Ashwanth VJ Karthi as Rajapandi Sankarapandi: Tulasi's husband
 Shankaresh Kumar replacement Santhosh as Saravanan alias Saravana Ponni 's ex-lover 
 Mahanadi Shankar as Sankarapandi: Rajapandi 's father Valli 's maternal uncle, Chinrasu 's uncle Ponni 's step father 
 Senthi Kumari as Chellathayey alias Chella: Rajapandi 's mother Valli 's maternal aunty, Chinrasu 's aunty, Ponni 's step mother 
 Eesan Sujatha as Gomathi: Sankarapandi 's sister, Rajapandi 's aunt
 Dhakshana as Valli Vetrivel: Vetrivel 's Wife  Gomathi's daughter, Rajapandi 's cousin  
 Manoj Kumar as Muthaiah: Ponni's father, Chinrasu and Thulasi 's maternal uncle
 Dhakshayini as Kamala: Ponni's mother, Chinrasu and Thulasi 's maternal aunt
 Seeni Amma as Rajakelavi : Chinrasu, Tulasi and Rajapandi 's grandmother 
 VJ Mounika as Poorni: Eshwari's daughter
 Sailatha as Eswari, Vetrivel's aunt
 Ravivarman as Vetrivel's father
 Vetrivelan as Shakthivel alias Shakthi Vetrivel's elder brother
 Subhageetha as Vetrivel's sister-in-law, who supports Vetrivel's love
 Jennifer as Chittu: Thulasi's friend 
 --- as Ranjith alias Parameshwaran (Paramugu): Poorni's husband, Vetrivel 's uncle 
 --- as pullikutty: Chinrasu and Thulasi house Mad
 godhandam as godhandam: Chinrasu and Thulasi house Mad

Special Appearances
Dharish Jayaseelan as Vishwanathan alias Vishwa 
Ashok Pandian as Vishwanathan's father
Sangeetha Balan as Vishwanathan's mother
Nidhish Kutty as Lord Kartikeya Murugan and Mukhil Sivasubramaniam 
Riya Manoj as Abhirami alias Abhi Sivasubramaniam 
Vidhya Vinu Mohan as Meenal alias Meena Sivasubramaniam
Aravind Akash as Dr. Sivasubramaniam
Papri Ghosh as Kayalvizhi Kutty Sundaram
Aarthi Subhash as Malliga Anbu Sundaram
Naresh Eswar as Kutty Sundaram
Guhan Shanmugam as Anbu Sundaram
Preethi Sharma as Venba Kavin
Nandan Loganathan as Kavin
Chaitra Reddy as Kayalvizhi alias Kayal

Production

Casting
Thaman Kumar was selected to portray the lead role as Chinrasu, In December 2021 he left the show because of an inconvenience of his role. Shreekumar replaced him in the role of Chinrasu from episode 313. Shwetha Khelge made her Tamil television acting debut with the series by playing as Thulasi. In December 2021 she quit the show. Maanya Anand replaced her in the role of Thulasi from episode 301. Debjani Modak was selected to portray a supporting role as Sandhiya. Karthi and Ashwanth Thilak play their supporting roles.

Special and crossover episodes 
 It had a Mahasangam with Poove Unakkaga from 1-7 February 2021, and then with Sundari from 12 to 24 July 2021.
 It had a special one-hour episode on 5 September 2021 named "Tulasiyin Unmai".
 It had another special 1 hour episode on 10 October 2021 named "Thirumana Kondattam".
 It had another 1 hour special episode on 9 January 2022 named "Maangalya Vizha".
 It had another 1 hour special episode on 13 June 2022 named "Gallatta Kalyanam".
 It had another 1 hour special episode on 4 September 2022 named "Karuppasamy Vettai".
 It had another 1 hour special episode on 12 March 2023 named "Thikku theriyatha kaatil".

Viewership

Ratings
It became the first-most watched Tamil television programme in the years 2020 and 2021 with 10.130 million impressions. From week 1 to till now, it maintained top 5 positions in TRP chart rating for most watched Tamil television programs.

Adaptations

Dubbed Version

References

External links 
 

Sun TV original programming
Tamil-language romance television series
Tamil-language television soap operas
2020 Tamil-language television series debuts
Television shows set in Tamil Nadu